Thorough may refer to:
 Thorough (policy) of Laud and Wentworth in England and Ireland in the 1630s
 Thorough Guides, late-Victorian travel guides
 HMS Thorough (P324), British submarine 1942–62
 Thorough-bass, a kind of musical notation in which numerals and symbols indicate intervals, chords, and non-chord tones, in relation to the bass note they are placed above or below. 
 Efficiency–thoroughness trade-off principle

See also
 Thoroughbred (disambiguation)
 Thoroughfare (disambiguation)
 Thoroughwort, genus Eupatorium of flowering plants in the aster family
 Thoroughly Modern Millie, 1967 musical